Alejandro Wiebe known by his stage name Marley (born 1 June 1970 in Carapachay, Buenos Aires Province, Argentina) is an Argentine TV host, comedian and producer. He is currently working for TV channel Telefe.

Early life 
Wiebe and his older brother went to a private school. At one point, his mother had to ask for half a scholarship to keep Marley at that school. Marley repeated the second year of high school, because he failed in English.

Career 

In 2002 he worked at the Telefe channel, with the program MundoShow. The show was about trips to different parts of the world, accompanied by celebrities from the country and ended in 2003.

Throughout 2003 he hosted the program El show de la tarde, together with Florencia Peña. That same year, after having made the first season of his celebrity biographies program called Protagonistas únicos, he was chosen to host the galas of the first season of the reality show Operación triunfo. At the end of 2003, he began Por el mundo, as a replacement to MundoShow and that would last until 2007. In 2004, he made Odisea, en busca del escarabajo dorado, from Costa Rica, which would later have two more seasons: Odisea, en busca del tesoro perdido (2005) and Odisea, aventura argentina (2007). He was called to do three more seasons of Operación triunfo: 2004–2005, 2005–2006 and 2009.

Personal life 
On October 27, 2017, in Chicago, United States, his son Mirko Wiebe was born, through surrogacy. Marley chose the egg from a Russian donor and the womb from an African-American.

Television

Awards

Nominations 
 2013 Martín Fierro Awards
 Best male TV host (for Tu cara me suena)

References

External links 

  Interview in Clarín

Argentine game show hosts
Argentine people of German descent
1970 births
Living people